Lake Surprise is a reservoir made by Surprise Lake Dam on the Blue Brook in Watchung Reservation.  On the border of Berkeley Heights and Mountainside in Union County, New Jersey, the lake was created in 1845 for David Felt's papermill.

The lake was previously known as Feltville Lake, then renamed Ackerman Lake, and renamed again as Silver Lake. The Union County Park Commission bought the property for inclusion in the Watchung Reservation and named it Lake Surprise, due to the winding road park planners paved, on which a visitor's view of the lake is obscured until the visitor is right next to the lake.

References

Bodies of water of Union County, New Jersey
Reservoirs in New Jersey
Watchung Mountains
1845 establishments in New Jersey